Châteauroux Métropole is the communauté d'agglomération, an intercommunal structure, centred on the city of Châteauroux. It is located in the Indre department, in the Centre-Val de Loire region, central France. Created in 2000, its seat is in Châteauroux. Its area is 537.9 km2. Its population was 72,767 in 2019, of which 43,122 in Châteauroux proper.

Composition
The communauté d'agglomération consists of the following 14 communes:

Ardentes
Arthon
Châteauroux
Coings
Déols
Diors
Étrechet
Jeu-les-Bois
Luant
Mâron
Montierchaume
Le Poinçonnet
Saint-Maur
Sassierges-Saint-Germain

References

Chateauroux
Chateauroux